"Mechanix" is a song by the American thrash metal band Megadeth. It is the eighth and final track from their debut studio album, Killing Is My Business... and Business Is Good!, which was released in 1985 by Combat Records.

The song was written for Dave Mustaine's first band Panic and was recorded by frontman Mustaine's former band Metallica, and featured on their 1982 No Life 'Til Leather demo. After Mustaine was fired from Metallica, he explicitly requested that the band not use any material he contributed, including "Mechanix". The song was reworked into "The Four Horsemen", which appeared on Metallica's debut album Kill 'Em All in 1983.

Music and lyrics
"Mechanix" was originally written by Dave Mustaine while he was in Panic before his tenure in Metallica. He would perform the song with Metallica during his time in the band and, after his departure, the music and lyrics were modified to create "The Four Horsemen". Originally, "Mechanix" was the same speed as "The Four Horsemen", but once Mustaine was kicked out of Metallica, he sped up the songs he wrote, including "Mechanix". He "wanted to be faster and heavier than them".

Lyrically, "Mechanix" is about having sex at a gas station and was inspired by Mustaine's time as a gas station attendant.

Controversy
When Mustaine was kicked out of Metallica, he reportedly told the band to not use his songs. However, the band not only used solos and riffs, but some of Mustaine's entire songs, including "Mechanix". Metallica frontman James Hetfield wrote lyrics about the Four Horsemen of the Apocalypse, and added a bridge (also written by Mustaine) and cleanly picked guitar solo in the middle. The two songs have sparked debate between many metal fans, over which one is better. In an interview after Megadeth's first ever show, Mustaine talked about the set they played, and said "... and then (we) go into the Mechanix, off of the No Life 'Til Leather demo. Exactly that way. Not with this 'Four Horsemen' wimp shit".

Accolades

Personnel 
Production and performance credits are adapted from the liner notes of Killing Is My Business... and Business Is Good!.

Megadeth
 Dave Mustaine – lead guitar, lead vocals
 David Ellefson – bass, backing vocals
 Chris Poland – rhythm guitar
 Gar Samuelson – drums

Production
 Produced and mixed by Dave Mustaine and Karat Faye
 Co-produced by Megadeth
 Pre-production by Jay Jones

2002 remix and remaster
 Mixed by Bill Kennedy
 Pro Tools by Chris Vrenna
 Mastered by Tom Baker
The Final Kill 2018 remix and remaster
 Mixed by Mark Lewis
 Mastered by Ted Jensen

References 

1982 songs
Megadeth songs
Metallica songs
Songs written by Dave Mustaine